The Hansa Pit was a mine on the territory of Harlingerode in the county of Wolfenbüttel in the Free State of Brunswick and later in Lower Saxony, West Germany. It was founded on the Langenberg south of Harlingerode; however, the only remainders are located on the north side.

Geology 
The Langenberg, internationally known for the discovery of Europasaurus and part of the Northern Harz Boundary Fault north of the Harz, consists of Korallenoolith with layers of chalky iron ore, containing up to 25% iron. On the northern part of the Hansa pit, limonite was more predominant and fossils of Orectolobiformes indet. were found.

History

19th century 
On behalf of consul Herrmann Henrich Meier, local geologist and director for mining administration Wilhelm Castendyck discovered the iron deposits beneath the Langenberg in the mid-19th century.

Hermann deposit 
The earliest deposit, the Hermann deposit, was first mentioned in 1860 and established soon after that. It was located north of the Langenberg, where the remaining area around the opening hole is conserved nowadays. In order to reach the significant pyrolusite conglomerate beneath the Langenberg, a tunnel with a length of 187 metres was drilled. However, due to the strong mountain pressure and brittle rock, the tunnel needed further support and it was decided to extend the tunnel west- and eastwards instead. Due to unprofitability, the Hermann deposit was abandoned in 1867.

Hansa deposit 
The relevant Hansa deposit was first documented in 1862. It was discovered as a characteristic Korallenoolith deposit in the Röseckenbach valley west of Göttingerode and southwest of the Langenberg. From here on, the seam was mined eastwards as far as to the outskirts of Schlewecke around 1.5 kilometres east.

A new area with the official name Hansa Pit was founded on June 3, 1865, west of where Göttingerode was founded later. Due to the very poor condition of roads at the location, the mine was temporarily closed in November 1865 until conditions improved.

20th century 
The aftermath of the Great Depression caused the mine to be temporarily shut down on March 15, 1932. However, due to the German Nazi Party's plans to gain more autarky with their ressources, the mine was put back into operation on November 1, 1935. In order to provide sufficient living space for the necessary workers, the Göttingerode settlement was erected south of the Langenberg and next to the Hansa pit.

In 1938-39, a connection to the Oker–Bad Harzburg railway was established by erecting a chain conveyor to the Harlingerode station.

The Hansa pit was closed on August 23, 1960, due to lack of profitability.

Links 
 Regionalverband Harz: Hansa Mine (English), 2022

References

Further reading 
 Alfred Breustedt: Eisenerzgrube Hansa. In: 950 Jahre Harlingerode. Bad Harzburg 2003, P. 83–93 (German)
 Werner Heindorf: Die ehemalige Eisenerzgrube „Hansa“ am nördlichen Harzrand bei Harlingerode (The former Iron ore pit "Hansa" on the northern part of the Harz mountains near Harlingerode). In: Allgemeiner Harz-Berg-Kalender (Common montane calendar of the Harz). 2007. P. 149–154
 Harald Meier, Kurt Neumann: Bad Harzburg. Chronik einer Stadt. 2000
 D. Thies. 1989. Some problematical sharks teeth (Chondrichthyes, Neoselachii) from the Early and Middle Jurassic of Germany. Paläontologische Zeitschrift 63:103-117

Iron mines in Germany
Former mines in Germany
Paleontology in Germany
Mining in the Harz
Bad Harzburg
Altenkirchen (district)